The bay-breasted warbler (Setophaga castanea) is a small species of songbird in the New World warbler family, Parulidae. It is one of thirty-four species in the diverse genus Setophaga. Like all songbirds, or passerines, the species is classified in the order Passeriformes.

Distribution
Bay-breasted warblers breed in the boreal spruce-fir forests of eastern and central Canada, as well as the extreme northern United States. The species winters in the wet lowland forests of northeastern South America, the Caribbean, and southern Central America, and may be seen during spring and fall migration across the eastern half of the United States in a variety of vegetative communities. Many individuals cross the Gulf of Mexico on their long-distance migration, although some travel north and south along the Mexican shore.

Diet and behavior
In the breeding season, bay-breasted warblers feed primarily on insects and spiders, especially the spruce budworm (Choristoneura fumiferana). These are gleaned from vegetation, never caught on the wing. To avoid competition with similar species, bay-breasted warblers concentrate their foraging on the breeding grounds to the interior middle portions of coniferous trees. On wintering grounds in the tropics, fruit forms a majority of the diet. Wintering bay-breasted warblers often form mixed-species flocks with other neotropical migrants and resident species. These flocks seek food in the forest canopy, and the bay-breasted warbler is often an aggressive member of the unit, bullying smaller species from potential food sources.

Breeding
Nests are typically constructed in the lower portion of a spruce or fir tree. The nest is cup-shaped and primarily composed of plant material, with spider silk often utilized as well. Average clutch size is 4-7 whitish eggs with dark spots. The young are altricial at birth, with limited down.

Description
Adult males in breeding plumage are primarily grayish above, with two white wing bars, dark streaks on the back, and a creamy neck patch. The face is black, and the crown, throat, and sides are a dark chestnut color. Breeding females are similar in overall pattern to the males, but are paler and duller. In the nonbreeding season, both sexes gain olive-green feathers on the back, nape, and head. The rufous on the flanks is limited and may even fade away entirely in nonbreeding females. The two white wing bars are present in all plumages.

Measurements

Similar species
In breeding plumage, the bay-breasted warbler may be confused with the chestnut-sided warbler (Setophaga pensylvanica), which has similar chestnut coloration on the sides. Chestnut-sided warblers may be easily differentiated by the extent of the chestnut, which does not reach the throat or crown. Chestnut-sided warblers also have a bright yellow crown, dark mask, and white cheek and throat in breeding plumage. In fall, nonbreeding bay-breasted Warblers may look very similar to the blackpoll warbler (Setophaga striata). However, blackpoll warblers never have a hint of chestnut coloration on the flanks, and also have yellowish feet, unlike the black feet of the bay-breasted warbler.

Conservation
Although currently classified by the IUCN as least concern, bay-breasted warblers, like many songbirds, are facing population declines across their range. A loss of insect prey and global climate change are contributing factors to decline. The global population is estimated to be fewer than 10 million individuals.

Etymology

References

External links

 
 Bay-breasted warbler species account - Cornell Lab of Ornithology
 Bay-breasted warbler - Dendroica castanea - USGS Patuxent Bird Identification InfoCenter
 
 
 

Setophaga
Birds of Canada
Native birds of the Northeastern United States
Birds of the Caribbean
Birds described in 1810
Taxa named by Alexander Wilson (ornithologist)